Professor Sukumar Nandi is senior member of IEEE and is in Department of Computer Science and Engineering at the Indian Institute of Technology Guwahati. Professor Nandi did his PhD from IIT Kharagpur under Professor P. Pal Chaudhri. He joined IIT Guwahati, and has been teaching there since 1995. He is also a member of the Board of Governors of IIT Guwahati.

He was appointed the "Dean of Academic Affairs" in IIT Guwahati in 2008, and held the post until 2012. He is now the Deputy Director of IIT Guwahati.

Notes

External links 
Sukumar Nandi's Homepage
Publications

Nandi,Sukumar
Indian computer scientists
Senior Members of the IEEE
Year of birth missing (living people)
IIT Kharagpur alumni
Academic staff of the Indian Institute of Technology Guwahati